Mordellistena bulgarica is a beetle in the genus Mordellistena of the family Mordellidae. It was described in 1977 by Ermisch.

References

bulgarica
Beetles described in 1977